The 1975–76 season was Newport County's 14th consecutive season in the Football League Fourth Division since relegation at the end of the 1961–62 season and their 48th overall in the Football League.

Season review
Newport continued to play in shirts with broad shoulder stripes from the end of the previous season (shown as third kit here) until late September 1975, when they switched to kits with three adidas stripes down the sleeves but no other branding. The broad shoulder stripe kit was also used on occasions throughout the rest of the season, including against Swindon in the FA Cup on 22 November 1975 and against Watford at home on 31 March 1976.

Results summary

Results by round

Fixtures and results

Fourth Division

FA Cup

Football League Cup

League table

Election

External links
 Newport County 1975-1976 : Results
 Newport County football club match record: 1976
 Welsh Cup 1975/76

References

 Amber in the Blood: A History of Newport County. 

1975-76
English football clubs 1975–76 season
1975–76 in Welsh football